Oak Hill Farm is a historic farm and former slave plantation in Tipton and Haywood Counties in Tennessee. Established in 1834, it was listed on the National Register of Historic Places in March 2013. Oak Hill Farm is also listed as a Tennessee Century Farm for continuous agricultural production since the 1830s.

References

Farmhouses in the United States
Historic farms in the United States
Houses in Haywood County, Tennessee
Houses in Tipton County, Tennessee
Plantation houses in Tennessee
Houses completed in 1834
Farms on the National Register of Historic Places in Tennessee
Houses on the National Register of Historic Places in Tennessee
National Register of Historic Places in Haywood County, Tennessee
National Register of Historic Places in Tipton County, Tennessee
1834 establishments in Tennessee
Century farms
Antebellum architecture
Federal architecture in Tennessee